William “Wil” Lutz (born July 7, 1994) is an American football placekicker for the New Orleans Saints of the National Football League (NFL). He played college football at Georgia State.

Early life
Lutz was born in Newnan, Georgia. Both his mother and father, Julie and Robert (Bob) Lutz, work in education and together have another son, Wesley. His mother served in various education jobs throughout Lutz's childhood, including as a principal of Canongate Elementary School in Sharpsburg, Georgia and more recently, as the assistant dean at Truett McConnell University in Cleveland, Georgia. His father, Bob, was a middle school science teacher at Madras Middle School in Newnan for a number of years.

Lutz attended Northgate High School in Newnan, where he competed in American football, soccer and cross country running. In his senior year, the Northgate Vikings went undefeated (9–0) in the regular season. The team defeated North Clayton High School in the first round of the Georgia AAAA football playoffs, before falling to East Paulding High School in the second round, concluding Lutz's high school football career. Lutz then enrolled at Georgia State University.

College career
Lutz was the kickoff specialist during the 2012 season and became the placekicker for Georgia State after four games. At the end of the 2012 season, Lutz made 4-of-7 (57%) field goals and was a perfect 18-for-18 on extra points. Lutz attempted his first field goal against William & Mary. Lutz kicked a season-long 40-yard field goal against Rhode Island.

At the end of the 2013 season, Lutz made 8-of-12 (67%) field goals and 25-of-26 (96%) extra points for 49 points. Lutz kicked a school record 53-yard field goal against Alabama.

Lutz was named the punter as well midway through the 2014 season. Phil Steele named Lutz to the Midseason All-Sun Belt first team. Lutz finished the 2014 season kicking 7-for-8 (88%) on field goals and 35-for-35 on extra points. Lutz averaged 39.0 yards on 16 punts. Lutz kicked a 26-yard game-winning field goal with four seconds left to lift GSU to a 38–37 victory over Abilene Christian in the 2014 season-opener.

Lutz was the punter and the placekicker for the 2015 season. Lutz averaged 44.3 yards on 65 punts, the second-best season average in school history. Lutz ended the 2015 season kicking 12-for-19 (63%) on field goals and 42–43 (98%) on extra points for 78 total points. Lutz scored a career-high 11 points with two field goals and five extra points against Texas State.

Professional career

Baltimore Ravens
On May 5, 2016, Lutz signed with the Baltimore Ravens after going undrafted in the 2016 NFL Draft. He was waived by the Ravens on August 29, 2016.

New Orleans Saints
On September 5, 2016, Lutz signed with the New Orleans Saints.

On September 18, 2016, against the New York Giants, Lutz had a field goal blocked by Johnathan Hankins, which was recovered by Janoris Jenkins for a Giants touchdown. On October 16, 2016, Lutz kicked a game-winning 52-yard field goal to defeat the Carolina Panthers, 41–38. On October 30, 2016, Lutz kicked a career-best four field goals against the Seattle Seahawks. Lutz earned NFC Special Teams Player of the Week honors in Week 6 and Week 8 of the 2016 season. The only other Saints rookies to win the honor twice in a season were punter Thomas Morstead and returner Reggie Bush. On December 18, 2016, Lutz made the 22nd and 23rd field goals of his rookie season, setting the record for the most field goals made by a rookie in franchise history. Lutz ended the season with 28 successful field goals. Lutz was named to the Pro Football Writers Association All-Rookie Team for 2016.

On September 11, 2017, Lutz tied his career high with four field goals in the season opening loss to the Minnesota Vikings on Monday Night Football.

On September 30, 2018, Lutz matched his career-high of four field goals, in a Week 4 victory over the New York Giants. Lutz was later named the NFC Special Teams Player of the Month for September 2018, having made 10 of 11 attempted field goals and 11 of 11 extra-point attempts.

On March 13, 2019, Lutz signed a five-year contract extension with the Saints.

In Week 1 of the 2019 season, against the Houston Texans, Lutz was a perfect 3-for-3 on extra points and 3-of-4 field goals. His 58-yard game-winning field goal was the longest game-winning field goal with no time remaining in the fourth quarter or overtime in a season opening game in NFL history. He was named NFC Special Teams Player of the Week for his performance.

In Week 2 of the 2020 season, against the Las Vegas Raiders on Monday Night Football, Lutz scored the first points in Allegiant Stadium history and the first ever points scored in the NFL in Las Vegas when he kicked a 31-yard field goal on the opening drive of the game.
In Week 5 against the Los Angeles Chargers, Lutz was a perfect 3 for 3 on field goal attempts and 3 for 3 on extra point attempts (scoring a total of 12 points) during the 30–27 win.  On October 14, 2020, Lutz was named the NFC Special Teams Player of the Week for his performance in Week 5.

On September 6, 2021, Lutz was placed on injured reserve.

NFL career statistics

References

External links
New Orleans Saints bio
Georgia State Panthers bio

1994 births
Living people
People from Newnan, Georgia
Sportspeople from the Atlanta metropolitan area
Players of American football from Georgia (U.S. state)
American football placekickers
Georgia State Panthers football players
Baltimore Ravens players
New Orleans Saints players